Mont Blanc du Tacul (4,248 m) is a mountain in the Mont Blanc massif of the French Alps situated midway between the Aiguille du Midi and Mont Blanc.

The official first ascent of Mont Blanc du Tacul was by a guideless party comprising Charles Hudson, Edward John Stevenson, Christopher and James Grenville Smith, E. S. Kennedy, Charles Ainslie and G. C. Joad on 8 August 1855. However, Courmayeur guides may have already ascended the peak during their attempts in 1854 and 1855 to force a way up Mont Blanc from the Italian side.

See also

List of 4000 metre peaks of the Alps

References

External links
 Mont Blanc du Tacul on SummitPost
 Routes on Mont Blanc du Tacul

Alpine four-thousanders
Mountains of the Alps
Mountains of Haute-Savoie
Mont Blanc massif